Streptocionella is a genus of sea snails, marine gastropod mollusks in the family Pyramidellidae, the pyrams and their allies.

Species
Species within the genus Streptocionella include:
 Streptocionella pluralis Dell, 1990
 Streptocionella singularis Pfeffer, G., 1886

References

External links
 To World Register of Marine Species

Pyramidellidae